Anci is a district of Langfang, Hebei, People's Republic of China.

Administrative divisions
Subdistricts:
South Yinhe Road Subdistrict, West Guangming Street Subdistrict, Yonghua Street Subdistrict

Towns:
Luofa, Matou, Geyucheng, Donggugang

Townships:
Yangshuiwu Township, Qiuzhuang Township, Diaohetou Township, Beishijiawu Township

Culture
Geyucheng Zhonggehui  Folk dance. Usually there are two layers of actors. The lower level is composed of strong men who are good at dancing. The higher level is composed of children, acting as 'female horn'.

Others like, Folk Music, Dishili Kite, Zhongfan

References

External links

 
County-level divisions of Hebei
Langfang